Luis Andrés Esteva Melchor (born 26 August 1951) is a Mexican politician affiliated with the National Action Party. As of 2014 he served as Deputy of the LVI and LIX Legislatures of the Mexican Congress as a plurinominal representative.

References

1951 births
Living people
People from Oaxaca City
Members of the Chamber of Deputies (Mexico)
National Action Party (Mexico) politicians
Politicians from Oaxaca
Benito Juárez Autonomous University of Oaxaca alumni
Members of the Congress of Oaxaca
20th-century Mexican politicians
21st-century Mexican politicians
Deputies of the LIX Legislature of Mexico